Union Sportive Colomiers Football, more commonly known as US Colomiers, is a French association football team founded in 1932. They are based in Colomiers, Haute-Garonne, France and play at the Stade Bertrand Andrieux in the town. They currently play in Championnat National 3.

Current squad

References

Association football clubs established in 1932
1932 establishments in France
Sport in Haute-Garonne
Football clubs in Occitania (administrative region)